Mofeed or Mufid Fawzy (19 June 1933 – 4 December 2022) was an Egyptian television presenter, interviewer and journalist. He produced and presented on Egyptian "Talk of the Town" ( Hadeeth Al Madena) for nearly 26 years. He was also a talk show co-host for Al-Qahira Al-Youm, a popular live talk show from Cairo, which airs on Orbit TV's El Yawm Channel. Mufid Fawzy was also the editor-in-chief of صباح الخير "Sabāh al-Khayr" Good Morning magazine published by Rose al-Yūsuf. Fawzy was married to late broadcaster Amal El-Omdah with whom he had one daughter - writer, poet and journalist for Nisft Al-Dunya magazine, Hanan Mofeed Fawzy.

Fawzy died on 4 December 2022 at the age of 89.

See also 
 List of Egyptians
 List of Copts

References

External links 
 Al-Qahera Al-Yom
 Hanan Mofeed Fawzy - Website of Mofeed Fawzy's Daughter

1933 births
2022 deaths
Egyptian television presenters
Egyptian journalists